The Autonomous University of San Luis Potosí (in ) is a public university in Mexico.  It is the largest, oldest, and most comprehensive university in the state of San Luis Potosí, as well as one of the most important ones in Mexico. Among other historic milestones, in 1923, UASLP was the first university in Mexico to have autonomy constitutionally granted.

History
The oldest antecedent of UASLP is a Jesuit college founded in 1624 in the city of San Luis Potosí to teach literacy, as well as secondary and high school studies.

In 1825, governor Ildefonso Díaz de León was directly involved in the creation of the Colegio Guadalupano Josefino. Opening on 2 June 1826, the college initially included academic programs in Humanities, Philosophy, Theology, and Law.  A Medicine program was added six years later. The first rector was Manuel María de Gorriño y Arduengo. Unfortunately, teachers were not always available and due to political and civil unrest there were times, especially in the 19th century, the college had to suspend classes on a temporary basis. Also, in 1855, the Colegio was closed, in conjunction with the expulsion of Jesuits from Mexico.

In 1859, authorities and local leaders reopened the institution under the name of Scientific and Literary Institute of San Luis Potosi, as a non-denominational higher education institution. However, since this event happened at the same time that the country was experiencing the Reform War (1858-1861), activities were limited during the first years of operation.

On 10 January 1923, governor Rafael Nieto issued Decree No. 106, which established the University of San Luis Potosí. The academic structure of the new institution included the faculties of Medicine, Law, Chemistry and Business. It also included the Civil Hospital, the San Luis Potosí Public Library, the State Meteorological Observatory, and the normal school for training teachers. The 1923 Decree granted autonomy to the University.

More recently, in 1949, the Decree Number 53, under Article 100 the Political Constitution of the State of San Luis Potosí, changed the name of the institution into its current one of Autonomous University of San Luis Potosí.

Organization
UASLP is organized in faculties (schools that offer postgraduate education), schools, coordinations, academic units and departments; it is divided into 15 faculties, 1 school, 4 coordinations, 1 department, 7 institutes, 12 research institutes, and 2 academic units for different and specific areas. Both undergraduate and graduate studies are available on each faculty. To date, UASLP has a student population of more than 32,000 people, and offers 99 undergraduate programs and 88 postgraduate programs.

Faculties
 Faculty of Accounting and Administration
 Faculty of Agronomy and Veterinary
 Faculty of Chemistry
 Faculty of Communication
 Faculty of Economics
 Faculty of Engineering
 Faculty of Humanities and Social Sciences
 Faculty of Information Sciences
 Faculty of Law
 Faculty of Medicine
 Faculty of Nursing and Nutrition
 Faculty of Psychology
 Faculty of Sciences
 Faculty of Stomatology
 Faculty of the Habitat (for architecture, design and building related studies)

Schools
 High School of Matehuala

Coordinations
 Academic Coordination, Altiplano Region (Matehuala)
 Academic Coordination, Huasteca South Region 
 Academic Coordination, West Altiplano Region
 Academic Coordination in Arts

Departments
 Department of Mathematical Physics

Academic units
 Multidisciplinary Academic Unit, Huastec Region (Ciudad Valles)
 Multidisciplinary Academic Unit, Media Region (Rio Verde)

Institutes
 Institute of Education Sciences
 Institute of Physics
 Institute of Geology
 Institute of Optical Communication Research (IICO)
 Humanistic Research Institute
 Desert Zones Research Institute
 Institute of Metallurgy

Research centers
 Research Center in Health Sciences and Biomedicine
 Research and Extension Center "El Balandrán"
 Biosciences Regional Center
 Coordination for the Innovation and Application of Science and Technology
 Research and Postgraduate Studies Center of the Faculty of Chemistry
 Research and Postgraduate Studies Center of the Faculty of Engineering
 Research and Postgraduate Studies Center of the Faculty of the Habitat
 Stomatology Research Center
 Integral Care Unit and Health Research
 Research and Postgraduate Studies Center in Agricultural Sciences
 Department of Research and Postgraduate Studies of the Faculty of Psychology
 Institute of Juridical Research

Notable alumni
Ponciano Arriaga (1811–1863), lawyer and Constitutional Congressman.
Manuel José Othón (1858–1906), poet
Primo Feliciano Velázquez, historian
Luis Ernesto Derbez (1947-), Mexico's Secretary of Foreign Affairs 2003-2006
Dos Caras Jr. (1977-), professional wrestler otherwise known as Alberto Del Rio and nephew of Mil Mascaras.

Notable staff
Salvador Nava Martínez (1914-1992), physician, politician and activist, professor in the School of Medicine
Valentin Afraimovich (1945-2018), Russian and Mexican mathematician that made contributions to dynamical systems theory

See also
 City University of Seattle (institutional partner)
 List of Jesuit sites

References

External links
 Official website of the Autonomous University of San Luis Potosi

Public universities and colleges in Mexico
Autonoma
Educational institutions established in 1923
1923 establishments in Mexico